The Newman United Methodist Church is a church and historic church building located in Grants Pass, Oregon, United States.

The church was listed on the National Register of Historic Places in 1977.

See also
National Register of Historic Places listings in Josephine County, Oregon

Notes

References

External links

Methodist churches in Oregon
Churches on the National Register of Historic Places in Oregon
Carpenter Gothic church buildings in Oregon
Churches completed in 1889
Buildings and structures in Josephine County, Oregon
Grants Pass, Oregon
National Register of Historic Places in Josephine County, Oregon